Matthias Finger (born in 1955) is Swiss and French political and educational scientist. He was a professor of management of network industries at EPFL (École Polytechnique Fédérale de Lausanne).

Career 
He received his Ph.D. in education in 1986 and his Ph.D. in political science in 1988, both from the University of Geneva. After having been Assistant Professor at Syracuse University, New York (1989-1991) and Associate Professor at Columbia University, New York (1992-1994), Matthias Finger was appointed Full Professor at the Swiss Graduate School of Public Administration (IDHEAP) in Lausanne in 1995. This is where he developed his research on the transformation of the network industries in the postal, the telecommunications, the railways, the electricity, the air transport, and the water sectors.

Matthias Finger was appointed Full Professor at the Swiss Federal Institute of Technology in October 2002 and Dean of Continuing Education in May 2003. Prof. Finger was the Academic Program Director of Executive Master in e-Governance and the Dean, School of Continuing Education in College of Management of Technology in EPFL. In July 2020, he retired from his functions at EPFL.

Research 

In his research, he reconciles the liberalization of these sectors with public service objectives by means of new regulatory arrangements, while at the same time promoting a more entrepreneurial behavior of the operators.

Selected works

References

External links 
 
 Archive website of the MIR Laboratory

1955 births
Living people
University of Geneva alumni